Joseph Francis Emanuel (born October 1998) is an English former first-class cricketer.

Emanuel was born at Camden in October 1998. He was educated at the City of London School, before going up to Durham University. While studying at Durham, he made a single appearance in first-class cricket for Durham MCCU against Northamptonshire at Northampton in 2019. Batting once in the match, he was dismissed for 20 runs in the Durham MCCU first innings by Blessing Muzarabani, while with his left-arm medium-fast bowling he took 2 wickets in Northamptonshire's first innings, dismissing Rob Newton and Richard Levi to take figures of 2 for 81.

References

External links

1998 births
Living people
People from Camden Town
People educated at the City of London School
English cricketers
Durham MCCU cricketers
Alumni of Collingwood College, Durham